Various opinion polls took place ahead of the 2004 Democratic Party presidential primaries.

Iowa

Source: Arizona - 2004 Presidential Polls

New Hampshire
Primary polling taken by American Research Group during the last few days of campaigning ( January 23 to January 27, 2004 ) showed that former New Hampshire poll leader as well as national leader Howard Dean was steadily gaining ground on Kerry. 

'Gathered from ARG's 2004 NH Democratic Tracking PollMargin of Error +/- 4''

Tracking polling showed that Dean had been catching up to Kerry in the days before the primary, cutting Kerry's 18 point lead to 10 points in a matter of days. With Dean dropping and Kerry rising, it became apparent that the battle for 1st place in New Hampshire would be close. Also, for third place, Wesley Clark, John Edwards and Joe Lieberman were the only ones fighting for third. With Clark  and Edwards both taking hits going into the primary, a Lieberman on the rise, the fight for 1st place and third place, according to polls would be intense.

Missouri

Source: Missouri - 2004 Presidential Polls

Delaware

Source: Delaware - 2004 Presidential Polls

Arizona

Source: Arizona - 2004 Presidential Polls

References

United States
2004 United States Democratic presidential primaries